Mt. Helium, formerly known as the Apex Theory, was an American rock band from Los Angeles, California, that was known for playing Mediterranean music mixed with progressive rock. The band has released three studio albums and three extended plays to date. Morrissey was a follower of the band.

History
The Apex Theory was formed in 1999 by Armenian-American musicians Ontronik "Andy" Khachaturian, Art Karamian and David Hakopyan (first drummer and bass player of Soil / System of a Down respectively), following Khachaturian's injury and subsequent departure from System of a Down. Sammy J. Watson joined the band after they were unable to find a committed drummer. The band released its first extended play, Extendemo, in 2000. The following year, they signed with DreamWorks Records, releasing their second EP The Apex Theory on October 9, 2001. The band performed at the main stage during the 2001 Warped Tour, and as co-headliners at the 2002 MTV2 tour.

On April 2, 2002, the band released its first album, Topsy-Turvy. It peaked at No. 6 on the Billboard Heatseekers chart and No. 157 on the Billboard 200. Months after the album's release, Khachaturian left the band, and they began to audition new vocalists before deciding that Karamian would take over as the band's vocalist, shifting the band from a quartet to a power trio. The band released an EP in 2004 entitled inthatskyissomethingwatching. After changing the name to Mt. Helium, the band released its second album, Faces, as a digital download on June 3, 2008.

Musical style
Former vocalist Ontronik Khachaturian described the band's sound as a "heavy Mediterranean groove". The Michigan Daily writer Sonya Sutherland wrote, "The Apex Theory combines a heavy drum support, melodic guitars and honey sweet vocals to provide an entertaining and emotional message." The band's musical style was influenced by Mediterranean, Middle Eastern and Near Eastern music. PopMatters described Topsy-Turvy as  "an energy-filled fusion of progressive and modern rock."

The MTV News writer Jon Wiederhorn wrote that "the Apex Theory's multi-textured music [...] combines metal, prog-rock, Mediterranean music and even jazz. And the off-kilter rhythm, skittering drums, whirlpool guitars and aggressive vocals of 'Shhh ... (Hope Diggy)' are a perfect taster for the band's debut album". Deseret News said that "Apex Theory's progressive punk mixed exotic music signatures with psychedelic rock". Mt. Helium's style has also been described as alternative metal, nu metal and post-grunge.

Band members
 David Hakopyan — bass guitar (1999–2008)
 Art Karamian — guitar, vocals (1999–2008)
 Ontronik "Andy" Khachaturian — vocals (1999–2002)
 Sammy J. Watson — drums (1999–2008)

Discography

Albums 
Topsy-Turvy (2002) (as The Apex Theory)
Faces (2008) (as Mt. Helium)

Extended plays 
Extendemo (2000) (as The Apex Theory)
 The Apex Theory (2001) (as The Apex Theory)
 Inthatskyissomethingwatching (2004) (as The Apex Theory)
 Lightpost (2007) (as The Apex Theory)

Promotional releasesRandom Bursts'' (2001) (as The Apex Theory)

References

External links

Armenian rock music groups
Musical groups from Los Angeles
Musical groups established in 1999
Progressive rock musical groups from California
American progressive metal musical groups
American musical trios
1999 establishments in California